The Chabot–Las Positas Community College District is a public school district based in Alameda County, California, in the United States. Colleges in the district include Chabot College in Hayward, and Las Positas College in Livermore.

External links
 

School districts in Alameda County, California
California Community Colleges